The Montenegrin Republic Cup was cup competition for Montenegrin lower-tier clubs in the period while Montenegro was a part of SFR Yugoslavia, FR Yugoslavia and Serbia and Montenegro. Winners and often a finalist of Montenegrin Republic Cup participated in the Yugoslav Cup and Serbia and Montenegro Cup. Competition played from 1947 to 2006, and after independence of Montenegro is succeeded by Montenegrin Cup.

Format and participants

During the existence of SFR Yugoslavia, Montenegrin Republic Cup had 32 participants or more. But, after the 1992, in Republic Cup participated 16 clubs.

Participants of Cup were the clubs which did not play in First Yugoslav league - mostly members of Second League and Montenegrin Republic League, and the winners and finalists of Montenegrin Regional Cups (northern, central, southern).

After Montenegrin independence (2006), the Montenegrin Republic Cup went defunct.

Winners by seasons

Source:

See also
Montenegrin Cup
Montenegrin Republic League
Montenegrin clubs in Yugoslav football competitions (1946–2006)
Football in Montenegro

References

Montenegrin Cup
Defunct football competitions in Montenegro
Yugoslav Cup
Defunct football competitions in Yugoslavia
Serbia and Montenegro Cup
Recurring sporting events established in 1947
Recurring sporting events disestablished in 2006
1947 establishments in Montenegro
2006 disestablishments in Montenegro